When You Were Mine may refer to:

"When You Were Mine" (Prince song) (1980), covered by Cyndi Lauper (1983)
"When You Were Mine" (Taylor Henderson song) (2014)
 "When You Were Mine" (The Church song) (1982), a single from the album The Blurred Crusade
 "When You Were Mine" (Shenandoah song) (1991), a single from the album Extra Mile
 When You Were Mine, an album by John Waite, 1997